Meteoblue (stylized as meteoblue) is a meteorological service created at the University of Basel, Switzerland. In 2006, Meteoblue was then founded as a spin-off company in order to serve customers especially in the area of agriculture as well as solar and wind power.

The impetus for the creation of this service came with the Sandoz chemical disaster near Basel in 1986. During the fire, health and safety services tried to get information pertaining to the wind direction in order to protect the population from poisonous and noxious gases. After receiving conflicting information from Swiss, French and German meteorological services – Basel is located at the tripoint of these three countries – researchers at the local university formed the Institute for Meteorology, Climatology and Remote Sensing intending to model the local weather situation more precisely. As this meteorological service did not yet have its own dedicated data center, weather predictions offered through the university's website were not available at all times, but the service soon grew into a favoured information source for alpinists, para-gliders, astronomers and farmers.

After the transition to a privately run meteorological company, Meteoblue was the world's first weather service to offer weather prediction in a graphical synopsis for any arbitrarily chosen location on earth. Beside that, it predicts weather for several continents on scales not familiar from other weather services, e.g. Europe using a 3 km (1.86 mi) grid, encompassing an area containing Belarus, Greece, Portugal and Ireland, or sub-Saharan Africa using a 10 km grid. Both Non-Hydrostatic Mesoscale Models (NMM, developed by NOAA) and the NOAA Environmental Modeling System (NEMS) are used to predict weather. Weather service is still publicly available, supported by ads, on its website, and the university's meteorological research institute still links to Meteoblue's weather predictions.

In 2020, Asobo partnered with Meteoblue to generate and deliver accurate weather conditions to the users of Microsoft Flight Simulator 2020.

Sources 
 http://www.basellandschaftlichezeitung.ch/basel/basel-stadt/basler-anbieter-prognostiziert-das-wetter-fuer-die-ganze-welt-126964541 (Newspaper report in German, July 29, 2013)
 https://content.meteoblue.com/en/about-us

External links 
 http://www.meteoblue.com web site of meteoblue

Meteorological companies
Information technology companies of Switzerland